Santa Paola Romana is a 20th-century parochial church and titular church in Rome, Italy, dedicated to Saint Paula of Rome.

History 

The church was built in 1949–51. Its bronze door was added in 2001, sculpted by Capri Otti.

On 14 February 2015, it was made a titular church to be held by a cardinal-priest, with its first titular being the Tongan bishop Soane Patita Paini Mafi.

Titulars
 Soane Patita Paini Mafi (2015–present)

References

External links

Titular churches
Rome Q. XIV Trionfale
Roman Catholic churches completed in 1951
20th-century Roman Catholic church buildings in Italy